Pestișu Mic is a commune in Hunedoara County, Transylvania, Romania. It is composed of nine villages: Almașu Mic (Keresztényalmás), Ciulpăz (Csulpesz), Cutin (Kutyén), Dumbrava (Erdőhát), Josani (Zsoszány), Mănerău (Magyarosd), Nandru (Nándor), Pestișu Mic and Valea Nandrului (Nándorválya).

References

Communes in Hunedoara County
Localities in Transylvania